A by-election was held for the New South Wales Legislative Assembly electorate of Orange on 30 August 1877. The by-election was triggered because Edward Combes had been appointed Secretary for Public Works in the fourth Robertson ministry. Such ministerial by-elections were usually uncontested however on this occasion, only Thomas Garrett (Camden) and Ezekiel Baker (Goldfields South) were unopposed. While the other ministers, John Robertson (West Sydney), John Davies (East Sydney), John Lackey and William Long (both Central Cumberland) were opposed, all were re-elected.

Dates

Results

Edward Combes was appointed Secretary for Public Works in the fourth Robertson ministry.

See also
Electoral results for the district of Orange
List of New South Wales state by-elections

Notes

References

1877 elections in Australia
New South Wales state by-elections
1870s in New South Wales